Benijófar is a municipality in the comarca of Vega Baja del Segura in the Valencian Community, Spain.

References

Municipalities in the Province of Alicante
Vega Baja del Segura